Larambha is a village in the Bargarh district in Odisha. India. It belongs to Attabira block. It consists of the hamlets of Larambha, Amastala, Karnatikra, and Garmuda. Its population is about 10,000. It is about 6 km from NH-6; SH-54 also touches the village. Cultivation is main occupation of the people. It is irrigated by the Hirakud Dam.

Education
Larambha is famous for its educational institutions. Larambha High School is one of the oldest high schools in undivided Sambalpur district. It was established in 1938 by the late Braja Mohan Panda. Initially it was a residential high school.

Larambha College (Braja Vihar) was established in 1964 by Mr B.M. Panda. It was started in the model of Shanti Niketan. Now it is a full-fledged college with Arts,Science and commerce streams.

References

External sources

Villages in Bargarh district